Lee Pil-jung (also transliterated Lee Pil-jong or Lee Pil-joong, born 4 August 1937) is a South Korean diver. He competed in the men's 10 metre platform event at the 1960 Summer Olympics.

References

External links
 

1937 births
Living people
South Korean male divers
Olympic divers of South Korea
Divers at the 1960 Summer Olympics
Sportspeople from Seoul
20th-century South Korean people